LaDonna Vita Tabbytite Harris (born February 26, 1931) is a Comanche Native American social activist and politician from Oklahoma. She is the founder and president of Americans for Indian Opportunity. Harris was a vice presidential candidate for the Citizens Party in the 1980 United States presidential election alongside Barry Commoner. She was the first Native American woman to run for vice president. In 2018, she became one of the inductees in the first induction ceremony held by the National Native American Hall of Fame.

Early life
Harris was born Ladonna Vita Tabbytite, in Temple, Oklahoma, to Lilly Tabbytite (Comanche) and Donald Crawford, a non-Native; the couple separated shortly after her birth. She was raised traditionally by her maternal grandparents in a self-governing Indigenous community on a farm near the small town of Walters, Oklahoma. She speaks Comanche as her first language. She learned English when she began attending public school. In 1949, shortly after graduating high school, she married Fred R. Harris. Ladonna supported Fred through college, and was very involved in his campaign for U.S. Senator. In 1964, Fred Harris was elected to the U.S. Senate, and the family, now with three children, relocated from Oklahoma to Washington D.C.

Earlier political career 
While residing in Washington D.C., LaDonna Harris was able to accomplish many things with her new connections through her husband in the U.S. Senate. She founded the first intertribal organization in Oklahoma, titled the Oklahomans for Indian Opportunity (OIO), and became the first wife of a senator to testify before Congress to argue for continued funding to support indigenous tribal organizations. President Lyndon B. Johnson recognized Ms. Harris's accomplishments and her impact on Native Americans, and appointed her to the National Council on Indian Opportunity (NICO). With the support of President Johnson, Harris created the first Native American-education course, titled "Indian 101", to be required completion by all members of Congress. Harris taught the course herself for thirty years.

She left NICO in 1970 and founded Americans for Indian Opportunity (AIO). From the 1970s to the present, she has presided over AIO, which works to advance the cultural, political and economic rights of Indigenous peoples in the U.S. and around the world. She helped found some of today's leading national Indian organizations including the National Indian Housing Council, Council of Energy Resource Tribes, National Tribal Environmental Council, and National Indian Business Association.

She has been appointed to many Presidential Commissions, including being recognized by Vice President Al Gore, in 1994, as a leader in the area of telecommunications in his remarks at the White House Tribal Summit. She was a founding member of Common Cause and the National Urban Coalition and is a spokesperson against poverty and social injustice. As an advocate for women's rights, she was a founder of the National Women's Political Caucus.

Political activism

Harris helped the Taos Pueblo regain control of Blue Lake, and she helped the Menominee tribe gain federal recognition after their tribe had been terminated by the US federal government. She was an original member of Global Tomorrow Coalition, the U.S. Representative to the OAS Inter-American Indigenous Institute, and the United Nations Educational, Scientific and Cultural Organization (UNESCO).

In the 1960s, Harris, as the wife of a United States Senator, lived in Washington, D.C. and was in constant social and political contact with the top echelons of the Democratic Party, up to and including President Lyndon B. Johnson and the First Lady. At the same time, her daughter Kathryn - at the time a university student - was deeply involved in the Anti war movement opposing the Vietnam War, which was conducted by the same President Johnson. Kathryn used to bring home other student activists to stay the night, and used the parental home as an unofficial headquarters where activists prepared for the next day's demonstrations and confrontations with police - with the tacit consent of her parents.

With the end of her husband's Congressional career, LaDonna Harris moved away from mainstream politics within the Democratic Party. In 1980, as the vice presidential nominee on the Citizens Party ticket with Barry Commoner, Harris added environmental issues to the national debate and future presidential campaigns. Although Harris was the first Indigenous woman to run for vice president, she was replaced on the ballot in Ohio by Wretha Hanson.

Harris endorsed Bernie Sanders for president during the 2016 Democratic presidential primaries.

She was an honorary co-chair of the Women's March on Washington, which took place on January 21, 2017, the day after the inauguration of Donald Trump as president.

Community involvement
Harris served on the boards of the Girl Scouts of the USA, Independent Sector, Council on Foundations, National Organization for Women, National Urban League, Save the Children, National Committee Against Discrimination in Housing, and Overseas Development Corporation.

Currently, she serves on the boards of Advancement of Maori Opportunity, Institute for 21st Century Agoras, National Senior Citizens Law Center, and Think New Mexico. She serves on the advisory boards of the National Museum of the American Indian, American Civil Liberties Union, Delphi International Group, and National Institute for Women of Color.

She is an honorary Member of Delta Sigma Theta sorority.

Adoption of Johnny Depp
After reading interviews of the filming of the 2013 movie The Lone Ranger, and that Johnny Depp's reprisal of the role of 'Tonto' would be as a Comanche, Harris decided to adopt Depp as an honorary son, making him an honorary member of her family but not an enrolled member of any tribe.  She discussed the idea with her adult children, and they agreed. A unique adoption ceremony took place on May 16, 2012, at Harris's home in Albuquerque, New Mexico, attended by the cultural advisor for The Lone Ranger and an official from the tribe. "Welcoming Johnny into the family in the traditional way was so fitting... He's a very thoughtful human being, and throughout his life and career, he has exhibited traits that are aligned with the values and worldview that Indigenous peoples share", Harris said. Critical coverage of Depp in Indian Country  increased after this, including satirical portrayals of Depp by Native comedians.

Harris also supported Depp when an ad featuring Depp and Native American imagery, by Dior for the fragrance "Sauvage", was pulled on August 30, 2019, after charges of cultural appropriation and racism.

In the original Radio Broadcast, Tonto was identified as being Potawatomi.

Family life
Harris has raised three children: Kathryn Tijerina is executive director of the Railyard Park Trust in Santa Fe; Byron is a technician in television production in Los Angeles; and Laura works with her mother as the executive director at AIO. Harris' grandson, Sam Fred Goodhope, calls her by the Comanche word for grandmother, Kaqu.

Filmography

Selected publications

References

External links

 Americans for Indian Opportunity, Official Website
 LaDonna Harris, Encyclopedia of Oklahoma History and Culture
 Voices of Oklahoma interview. First person interview conducted on September 21, 2017, with LaDonna Harris.
 Interview with Ladonna Harris by Stephen McKiernan, Binghamton University Libraries Center for the Study of the 1960s, March 8, 2011

1931 births
Living people
American autobiographers
Citizens Party (United States) politicians
Comanche people
Native American activists
Native American candidates for Vice President of the United States
Native American women writers
People from Cotton County, Oklahoma
1980 United States vice-presidential candidates
20th-century American politicians
Women in Oklahoma politics
Female candidates for Vice President of the United States
Women autobiographers
Native American women in politics
Oklahoma Democrats
20th-century American women politicians
American women non-fiction writers
Johnny Depp
Writers from Oklahoma
20th-century Native American women
20th-century Native Americans
21st-century Native American women
21st-century Native Americans